Cryptops hortensis, the common cryptops, is a species of centipede in the family Cryptopidae, genus Cryptops (Leach 1814).

Description
It is pale brown in colour with 21 pairs of legs.

Distribution and habitat
This species is found in all of Europe except for: the Baltic states, Andorra, Belarus, Liechtenstein, Luxembourg, Moldova, Russia, Vatican City and various European islands. It has also been introduced to Tasmania, Australia. It is found in gardens and woodland, and under stones and logs.

References

External links
 Images of Cryptops hortensis
 [https://www.youtube.com/watch?v=5NPncswPXuE Video of Cryptops hortensis'''] on YouTube
 See also David Nield: Meet The 'King' of a Toxic Underground Ecosystem Unlike Anywhere Else on Earth (on: sciencealert, 19 December 2020) about Cryptops speleorex'' living in the Movile Cave, Romania.

hortensis
Animals described in 1810
Myriapods of Europe
Centipedes of Australia
Taxa named by Edward Donovan
Fauna of Tasmania